Lefebvrea is a genus of flowering plants belonging to the family Apiaceae.

Its native range is Tropical and southern Africa. It is found in Angola, Benin, Burundi, Cameroon, Central African Republic, Chad, Congo, DRC, Eswatini, Ethiopia, Kenya, Malawi, Mozambique, Namibia, Nigeria, Rwanda, South Africa (Cape Provinces, KwaZulu-Natal and the Northern Provinces), Sudan, Tanzania, Uganda, Zambia, and Zimbabwe.

The genus name of Lefebvrea is in honour of Charlemagne Théophile Lefebvre (1811–1860), a French naval officer and explorer, that took part in a scientific expedition in Ethiopia. It was first described and published in Ann. Sci. Nat., Bot., sér.2, Vol.14 on page 260 in 1840.

Known species
According to Kew:
Lefebvrea abyssinica 
Lefebvrea atropurpurea 
Lefebvrea brachystyla 
Lefebvrea droopii 
Lefebvrea grantii 
Lefebvrea oblongisecta 
Lefebvrea stenosperma 
Lefebvrea tenuis

References

Apioideae
Apioideae genera